Qeshlaq-e Dowlama (also Romanized as Qeshlāq-e Dowlāmā) is a village in Angut-e Gharbi Rural District, Anguti District, Germi County, Ardabil Province, Iran. At the 2006 census, its population was 29, in 4 families.

References 

Towns and villages in Germi County